The following is the list of ambassadors from Serbia. The list is in alphabetical order by country. In brackets are the countries for which the embassy is responsible on non-residential basis.

List of ambassadors
 — Miroljub Zarić
 — Aleksandar Jovanović (Guinea Bissau, Mali)
 — Dragan Marković (Equatorial Guinea, Gabon, Guinea and Senegal)
 - Jela Baćović (Chile, Paraguay, Peru, Uruguay)
 — Miroljub Petrović (Embassy of Serbia in Canberra) (Fiji, New Zealand, Papua New Guinea, Samoa, Tonga, Vanuatu)
Consul General Branko Radošević in Sydney
 — Nebojša Rodić (Embassy of Serbia in Vienna)
Consul-General Vladimir Novaković in Salzburg
 - Danica Veinović (Chargé d'Affaires a.i.)
 - Veljko Kovačević
 — Marina Jovićević
 — Aleksandar Đorđević
Consul General Vladimir Nikolić in Banja Luka
Consul General Goran Stojković in Mostar
 — Veljko Lazić (Bolivia, Colombia, Ecuador, Guyana)
 — Vladimir Ćurgus
 - Mihailo Papazoglu
Gerant Spasoje Milićević in Toronto
 - Milan Bačević (Mongolia, North Korea, Pakistan)
Vice-consul gerant Dejan Marinković in Shanghai
 - Radomir Živković
 - Mira Nikolić
Gerant Momčilo Radivojević  in Rijeka
Consul General Živorad Simić in Vukovar
 - Danilo Pantović (Dominican Republic, Haiti, Jamaica, Venezuela)
 - Marko Blagojević 
 - Vera Mavrić
 - Dragana Ivanović
 - Jugoslav Vukadinović (Sudan)
 - Aleksandar Ristić (Djibouti, Tanzania, Seychelles)
 - Saša Obradović (Estonia)
 - Nataša Marić (Embassy of Serbia in Paris)
Consul Božidar Jovanović in Strasbourg
 - Dušan Crnogorčević (Embassy of Serbia in Berlin)
Consul General Aleksandra Đorđević in Frankfurt
Consul General Momirka Marinković in Hamburg
Consul General Snežana Miljanić in Munich
Consul General Božidar Vučurović in Stuttgart
Consul General Nebojša Košutić in Düsseldorf
 - Dušan Spasojević (Armenia)
Consul General Siniša Pavić in Thessaloniki
 - Dejan Šahović
 - Barbara Avdalović (Embassy of Serbia in Budapest)
 - Vladimir Marić (Afghanistan, Bangladesh, Bhutan, Maldives, Nepal, Sri Lanka)
 - Slobodan Marinković (Brunei, Cambodia, East Timor, Malaysia, Philippines, Singapore, Thailand, Vietnam)
 - Dragan Todorović
 - Uroš Balov
 - Milutin Stanojević
 - Goran Aleksić (Malta, San Marino)
Consul General Nebojša Vušurović in Milan
Consul General Dragan Kićanović in Trieste
 - Nenad Glišić
 - Vladan Matić
 - Dragan Županjevac (Burundi, Comoros, Eritrea, Rwanda, Somalia and Uganda)
 - Vladimir Kohut (Bahrain, Oman, Qatar, Yemen)
 — Emir Elfić (Jordan)
 - Gradimir Gajić (Chad) (Chargé d'Affaires a.i.) 
 - Goran Mešić (Costa Rica, El Salvador, Guatemala, Honduras, Nicaragua, Panama)
 - Slađana Prica (Mauritania)
 - Zoran Bingulac
Consul General Slobodan Bajić in Herceg Novi
 - Miodrag Nikolin (Laos)
 - Petar Vico
 - Đura Likar (Cameroon, Ghana)
 - Dušanka Divjak Tomić
 - Suzana Bošković-Prodanović (Embassy of Serbia in Oslo) (Iceland)
 - Nikola Zurovac (Lithuania)
 - Ana Ilić
 - Jasminko Pozderac
 - Branko Branković (Moldova)
Consul General Lazar Manojlović in Timișoara
 - Momčilo Babić (Kyrgyzstan, Tajikistan, Turkmenistan, Uzbekistan) (Embassy of Serbia in Moscow)
 - Muhamed Jusufspahić
 - Aleksandra Radosavljević (Chargé d'Affaires a.i.) 
 - Zorana Vlatković
 - Goran Vujičić (Botswana, Lesotho, Malawi, Mauritius, Mozambique, Namibia, Swaziland, Zimbabwe)
 - Zoran Kazazović
 - Katarina Lalić-Smajević (Andorra)
 - Dragan Momčilović (Latvia) 
 - Snežana Janković (Liechtenstein)
Consul General Zoran Jeremić in Zürich
 - Milan Vijatović (Chargé d'Affaires a.i.) 
 - Nikola Lukić
 - Zoran Marković
Consul General Zoran Marković in Istanbul
 - Rade Bulatović (Georgia)
 - Stanimir Vukićević
 - Aleksandra Joksimović (Ireland) (Embassy of Serbia in London) (Chargé d'Affaires a.i.) 
 - Marko Đurić (Antigua and Barbuda, The Bahamas, Barbados, Belize, Dominica, Grenada, Saint Lucia, Saint Kitts and Nevis, Saint Vincent and the Grenadines, Suriname, Trinidad and Tobago) (Embassy of Serbia in Washington, D.C.)
Gerant Milan Varadinović in Chicago
Consul General Mirjana Živković in New York City
 - Vladimir Odavić (Chargé d'Affaires a.i.)

{| class="collapsible collapsed" border="0"
! style="width:40em; text-align:left" | List of honorary Consuls
! | 
|-
|
|-
|

Maria Cristina Capitanich in Presidente Roque Sáenz Peña
 - Luke Simpkins in Perth
 - Dieter H. M. Szolar in Graz
 - Syed Kader Iqbal in Dhaka
 - Aleksandar Davidovic in Mortsel
 - Zana Petkovic Kuljaca de Rodriguez in La Paz

Édison Freitas de Siqueira in Porto Alegre
José Guilherme de Godoy Pinheiro in São Paulo
Edson José Ramon in Curitiba
Dejan Petkovic in Juiz de Fora

Milica Opačić in Calgary
Peter Vladikovic in Vancouver
Marina Gavanski-Zissis in Montreal
 - Damir Solar in Santiago
 - Hernan Sanin Posada in Bogotá
 - Stanko Trifunovic in San Joaquín de Flores
 - Kypros V. Eliades in Larnaca
 - Ramon de la Roha in Santo Domingo
 - Dusan Draskovic in Guayaquil
 - José Luis Saca Melendez  in San Salvador
 - Robert-Louis Liris in Clermont-Ferrand
 - Clifford Odartey Lamptey in Accra

Spyridon Mastoras in Corfu
Victor Ruhotas in Argostoli
Symeon Tsomokos in Volos
 - Marcela Arzu de Lozano in Guatemala City
 - Jean Jacque Grenier in Conakry
 - José Jorge Villeda Toledo  in Tegucigalpa
 - Tibor Görög in Szeged

Taizun Patheria in Mumbai
 - Živko Jakšić in Dublin
 - Boris Krasny in Jerusalem

Loreta Baggio in Treviso
Leandro Chiarelli in Florence
 - John Issa in Kingston
 - Naohide Ueyama in Osaka
 - Camille Hanna Elias Hanna in Amman
 - Joseph Martinos in Beirut
 - Siljan Micevski in Bitola
 - Maminiaina Ravatomanga in Antananarivo
 - Yaya Diakite in Bamako
 - Gordon Pace Bonello in Mosta
 - Seddik Bargash in Casablanca
 - Goran Đoković in Monte Carlo
 - Bavuu Zorigt in Ulan Bator
 - John William Kachamila in Maputo
 - Bavuu Zorigt in Ulan Bator
 - Stevan Berber in Auckland
 - Juan Ignacio Castillo in Managua

Domingo Alaba John Obende in Lagos
Farouk Adamu Aliyu in Kano
 - Tarik Rafi in Karachi
 - Jorge Silvio Milos Giucich in Asunción
 - Norbert Lind Pertovic in Lima
 - Joaquin Jack Rodrigez  in Makati
 - Ranko Tomović in Katowice
 - António José Paixão Pinto Marante in Albufeira
 - Gennady Nikolaevich Timchenko in Saint Petersburg
 - Miodrag Todorović in Mahé
 - Adonis Abboud in Freetown

Mojmir Vrlik in Martin
Eva Dekanovska in Košice
 - Tomaž Kavčič in Vipava
 - Udaya Nanayakkara in Colombo
 - Ahmed Abdel Moneim Abdel Mouti Mohammed in Khartoum

Juan Manuel Contreras Guyard in Sevilla
Jose Maria Dominguez Silva in Las Palmas de Gran Canaria
Juan Carlos Trillo Baigorri in Zaragoza
 - Elias Sargon in Aleppo

Fikret Öztürk in Serik
Metin Akdurak  in İzmir
 - Jovan Latinčić in Kampala

Ronald W. Burkle in Big Sky for Montana and Washington
Ryan Fredrick Osborne in Los Angeles for California
Gregory Rusovich in Kenner for Louisiana
Jonathan Lawrence Vinnik in Cheyenne for Wyoming
Steven H. Katich in Denver for Colorado
|}

List of ambassadors to international organizations
 Council of Europe - Aleksandra Đurović in Strasbourg 
 - Ana Hrustanović in Brussels
 - Miomir Udovički in Brussels
 Organization for Security and Co-operation in Europe (OSCE) - Roksanda Ninčić, OSCE and other organizations in Vienna
 - Tamara Rastovac Siamašvili in Paris
 - Milan Milanović in New York City (Covers bilateral relations with Benin, Burkina Faso, Central African Republic, Côte d'Ivoire, The Gambia, Liberia, Madagascar,  Mauritania, Niger, São Tomé and Príncipe, Sierra Leone, Somalia and Togo)
 - Dejan Zlatanović in Geneva

References

External links
The Ministry of Foreign Affairs

See also
Foreign relations of Serbia
List of diplomatic missions of Serbia
List of diplomatic missions in Serbia

Serbia